Super Satin is a Hong Kong based Thoroughbred racehorse. In the season of 2009–2010, he won the Hong Kong Derby. He was also one of the nominees for Hong Kong Horse of the Year.

References
 The Hong Kong Jockey Club – Super Satin Racing Record
 The Hong Kong Jockey Club

2005 racehorse births
Hong Kong racehorses
Racehorses trained in Hong Kong